Beautiful Addiction may refer to:
"Beautiful Addiction", a song by Audiovent from Dirty Sexy Knights in Paris
"Beautiful Addiction, a song by Eligh and Amp Live featuring Grieves and Blake Hazard from Therapy at 3
"Beautiful Addiction", a song by rapper NF